Darevskia derjugini is a species of lizard in the family Lacertidae. The species is native to Southeast Europe and Western Asia. There are six recognized subspecies.

Etymology
The specific name, derjugini, is in honor of Russian hydrobiologist Konstantin Michailovich Derjugin.

Geographic range
D. derjugini is found in Azerbaijan, Georgia, southwestern Russia, and Turkey.

Habitat

Reproduction
D. derjugini is oviparous. Clutch size is four to eight eggs.

Subspecies
Six subspecies are recognized as being valid, including the nominotypical subspecies.
Darevskia derjugini abchasica 
Darevskia derjugini barani 
Darevskis derjugini boehmei 
Darevskia derjugini derjugini 
Darevskia derjugini orlowae 
Darevskia derjugini silvatica

References

Further reading
Bartenef A, Reznikova M (1931). "Neue Lacerta-Formen (Reptilia) aus dem Kaukasischen Staatsnaturschutzgebiet (Westkaukasus)". Zoologischer Anzeiger 96 (9/10): 268–271. (Lacerta derjugini silvatica, new subspecies). (in German).
Bischoff W (1982). "Zur Kenntnis der innerartlichen Gliederung der Artwiner Eidechse Lacerta derjugini Nikolsky, 1898 ". Zoologisches Abhandlungen, Staatliches Museum für Tierkunde in Dresden 1 (38): 1–52. (Lacerta derjugini abchasica, new subspecies, p. 44; L. d. barani, n. ssp., p. 32; L. d. boehmei, n. ssp., p. 46). (in German).
Bischoff W (1984). "Bemerkungen zur innerartlichen Gliederung und zur Verbreitung der Artwiner Eidechse (Lacerta derjugini Nikolskij 1898) an den Südhängen des Grossen Kaukasas (Sauria: Lacertidae)". Salamandra 20 (2/3): 101–111. (Lacerta derjugini orlowae, new subspecies). (in German, with an abstract in English, and bilingual captions).
Nikolsky A (1898). "[On two new lizards from Russia]". Annuaire du Musée Zoologique de l'Académie Impériale des Sciences de St.-Pétersbourg 3: 284–288. (Lacerta derjugini, new species, pp. 284–286). (in Latin and Russian).

Darevskia
Fauna of Georgia (country)
Reptiles described in 1898
Taxa named by Alexander Nikolsky
Reptiles of Russia